Ch'api Qullu (Aymara ch'api thorn, qullu mountain, "thorn mountain", also spelled Chapi Khollu, Chapi Kkollu) is a  mountain in the Bolivian Andes. It is located in the La Paz Department, Loayza Province, Luribay Municipality. Ch'api Qullu lies northeast of Jach'a Ch'uñu Uma.

References 

Mountains of La Paz Department (Bolivia)